is a telecommunications and media company based in Japan, headed by Nobuo Kawakami. The company became a wholly owned subsidiary of Kadokawa Corporation on October 1, 2014. The company was spun off from a U.S.-based service offering online multiplayer for video games, DWANGO (Dial-up Wide-Area Network Game Operation), which was shut down in 1998. Dwango's majority shareholders until its merger with Kadokawa Corporation included Kawakami himself, Kadokawa Corporation, and Avex Group. Dwango runs the popular Japanese video sharing site Niconico. The company also is the 100% owner of the game developer Spike Chunsoft, which Dwango bought as the companies Spike and Chunsoft in 2005 when they were separated companies, before merging them in 2012.

History 
In November 2013, it was confirmed Nintendo purchased 612,200 or 1.5% shares of the company at the request of Nobuo Kawakami.

On May 14, 2014, it was announced that Dwango and Kadokawa Corporation would merge on October 1, 2014, and form the new holding company  Kadokawa Dwango Corporation. Both Kadokawa and Dwango became subsidiaries of the new company.

In February 2019, Kadokawa Dwango announced that Dwango would stop being their subsidiary to be a direct subsidiary of Kadokawa Corporation in a reorganization of the company.

In July 2019, Mages was acquired by its CEO concept studio Chiyomaru Studio and stopped being a subsidiary of Dwango and part of the Kadokawa Group.

References

External links 
 

 
Kadokawa Corporation subsidiaries
Japanese companies established in 1997
Mass media companies established in 1997
Internet technology companies of Japan